The 1879 Pennsylvania Military Academy football team represented Pennsylvania Military Academy during the 1879 college football season. The team played Swarthmore, Penn, and as one cadet put it, “whoever we could inveigle into coming to us.” 
The game against the Crescents Football Club was reported to be first game played at the Military Academy.   The result of the contest with Swarthmore is not known.

Schedule

References

Pennsylvania Military Academy
Widener Pride football seasons
College football winless seasons
Pennsylvania Military Academy football